Glen Wilkinson (born 4 July 1959) is an Australian professional snooker player from Miranda, New South Wales who is currently ranked the number ten snooker player in Australia. He is also a National Director of Coaching for snooker in Australia.

Career
In 1983 Wilkinson got the highest break (105) in the Australian Open Championship in Gosford, New South Wales and the following year he went on to win the Open in Perth, Western Australia at the age of 25, again having the highest break of the tournament with 101. A year later he turned professional and moved to England to compete, where he had moderate success reaching a world ranking of No. 91. Returning to Australia in 1990, he was runner-up in the Australian Open Championship in 1998 with the tournament now being held in Sydney each year.

His next tournament win came in 1999 when he won the Rooty Hill Masters, the World Professional Billiards and Snooker Association (WPBSA) South Pacific Snooker Championship and The New South Wales (NSW) Open Snooker Championship. In 2000 he successfully defended both his Rooty Hill Masters and The NSW Open Championship titles.

He won The NSW Open Championship again in 2001, 2002 and 2004.  
He reached the semi-finals of the Australian Open Championship in 2001 and 2004

However, between 2001 and 2004 it was the only title he won until 2005 when he won both the NSW Open Championship and also the Central Coast Leagues Club Classic, held in Gosford, New South Wales beating Joe Minici in the final. He was also runner-up in the Australian Open Championship, where he lost to Dene O'Kane of New Zealand in the final and runner-up to Steve Mifsud in the Princes Coca-Cola Cup. In the Kings Australia Cup he reached the semi-finals where he lost to eventual winner Neil Robertson.

In 2006 at the age of 47, he won the inaugural Australian Masters Championship, beating Paul Asher in the final. He was also runner-up in three tournaments – the International Billiards and Snooker Federation (IBSF) World Masters, the Central Coast Leagues Club Classic, where he lost to Neil Robertson. and the Fred Osbourne Memorial Snooker, losing to James Mifsud as well as reaching the semi-finals of the Australian Open Championship, where he lost to Dene O'Kane, the Princes Coca-Cola Cup where he lost to eventual winner Aaron Mahoney the Lance Pannell Snooker Classic where he lost to Steve Mifsud, the NSW Open Championship and the Oceania Snooker Championship. In the South Pacific Snooker Championship he reached the quarter-final stage before losing to eventual winner Paul Balzer.

In 2007 he had his most successful year to date, winning the Australian Open Championship, the Australian National Championship held at the RACV Club in Melbourne beating Shawn Budd in the final, the Australian Masters Championship, beating Nathan Webb in the final the Queensland Open, beating Steve Mifsud in the final. and the NSW Open Championship. 
He also reached the final of the Allied Metal Recyclers West Coast International where he lost to Neil Robertson. In the Central Coast Leagues Club Classic he reached the semi-finals. He also reached the semi-finals of the Lance Pannell Snooker Classic and the Princes Coca-Cola Cup He again reached the quarter-finals of the South Pacific Open Championship

In 2008 Wilkinson won the Oceania Championship beating Chris McBreen in the final. In the Kings Australia Cup he reached the semi-finals losing to Neil Robertson. He also reached the semi-finals of the Australian Masters Championship and the Lance Pannell Snooker Classic. He is currently ranked at number two in Australia behind Steve Mifsud.

Wilkinson is now one of two National Directors of Coaching along with Robby Foldvari, appointed by the Australian Billiards & Snooker Council.

Tournament wins

Australia/World championships
 Australian Open Championship – 1984, 2007
 Australian Masters Championship – 2006, 2007
 Australian National Championship – 2007
 Oceania Championship – 2008, 2009

National ranking tournaments
 WPBSA South Pacific Snooker Championship – 1999
 Central Coast League Club Classic – 2005

State championships
 New South Wales Open Championship – 1999, 2000, 2001, 2002, 2004, 2005, 2007
 Queensland Open – 2007
 New South Wales Doubles Champion – 2007, 2008, 2009 (partner Alex Render)

Other tournaments
 Rooty Hill Masters – 1999, 2000

References

Australian snooker players
1959 births
Living people
Sportspeople from Sydney
Competitors at the 2009 World Games